The Second Swedish Crusade was a possible 13th-century Swedish military expedition against the Tavastians, in present-day Finland, led by Birger Jarl. Many details of the Crusade are debated. After the crusade, Tavastia gradually started to fall under the rule of the Catholic Church and the Swedish kingdom.

Background

Sweden had been starting to exert control over Finland at least since the beginning in the 13th century, starting with Finland proper. In 1220, Sweden tried to join in on the Baltic Crusades, but could not hold on to their foothold in Estonia. There are notes of Swedish churchmen, possibly led by Finland's bishop Thomas, being present in Tavastia ca 1230, and papal letters deplored how slowly Christianity gained ground in Finland. There was apparently a backlash against the missionaries (the Häme insurrection), and in 1237, Pope Gregory IX sent out a call for the Swedes to take up arms in a crusade against the "apostates and barbarians".

Sources
All details of the crusade are from Eric's Chronicle, which is largely propagandist in nature, written a century after the events, amidst internal unrest and a war against Novgorod. The chronicle says that the crusade took place between the Battle of Sparrsätra in 1247 and the death of King Eric (XI) in 1250, and presents the Tavastians (taffwesta) as the Swedes' opponents. According to the chronicle, the expedition was prepared in Sweden and then conducted over sea to a land on the coast, where the enemy was waiting.

The Chronicle also mentioned that a castle called taffwesta borg was established after the war. The Chronicle also linked the Crusade to a contest with the Orthodox Russians, making a point of the fact that the "Russian king" had now lost the conquered land.

The so-called "Detmar Chronicle" of Lübeck from around 1340 confirmed the expedition with a short note that Birger Jarl submitted Finland under Swedish rule.

Interpretations
Unlike the doubted First Swedish crusade, there seems to be little doubt that Sweden's effort to Christianize Finland reached a culmination in the middle of the 13th century. Still, many details, including the year and the exact nature, remain the subject of debate.

Nature of the Crusade
Although the Chronicles attempted to paint the Crusade as a war of conquest, it was likely more of an unusually bloody phase in the ongoing process by which Finland was incorporated in the Swedish state. Sweden had a central government and a strong ideological force in the form of the Catholic church. The Finnish chieftains who joined gained power and prestige.

Dating
The dating of the Crusade has been somewhat disputed. In addition to the 1247–1250 date given in "Eric's Chronicle", proposals have been made to date the attack to either 1238–1239 or 1256. Neither of the latter dates has received wide acceptance. Swedish historian Dick Harrison finds the theory of an early crusade most probable, based on the papal letter, which would also make the war a properly sanctioned crusade, and the fact that Sweden was otherwise peaceful during that period.

Taffwesta borg
The Chronicle mentioned an impressive castle that was built by the Swedes, taffwesta borg. This has been interpreted as either Häme Castle (Swedish Tavastehus) or the nearby Hakoinen Castle, but there is no archaeological evidence at either site to support such an early dating.

Aftermath

Church reaction and reorganization

Probably in an effort to prevent other parties from getting involved in the conflict, Pope Innocent IV took Finland under his special protection in August 1249 but without mentioning Sweden in any way. The bishop of Finland, Thomas, probably a Dominican friar, had resigned already in 1245 and died three years later in a Dominican convent in Gotland. The seat being vacant, the diocese had probably been under the direct command of the papal legate, William of Modena, whose last orders to Finnish priests were given in June 1248.

Bero was eventually appointed as the new bishop in 1248/9, presumably soon after William's visit to Sweden for an important church meeting at Skänninge that ended on 1 March 1248. The so-called "Palmsköld booklet" from 1448 noted that it was Bero who gave the Finns' tax to the Swedish king. Bero came directly from the Swedish court, like his two successors. It seems that Swedish bishops also held all secular power in Finland until the 1280s, when the position of the Duke of Finland was established.

In 1249, the situation was also seen clear enough to establish the first monastery in Finland, a Dominican convent. The convent was next to the bishop's fortification in Koroinen until the end of the century.

Swedish succession

Eric's Chronicle tells of how, as an unexpected side effect, the expedition seems to have cost Birger the Swedish crown. When King Eric died in 1250, Birger was absent from Sweden. The Swedish lords, led by Joar Blå, selected Birger's underaged son Valdemar as the new king, instead of the powerful jarl himself.

Swedish rule in Finland
From 1249 onwards, sources generally regard Finland Proper and Tavastia as a part of Sweden. The Diocese of Finland proper is listed among the Swedish dioceses for the first time in 1253. In the Novgorod First Chronicle, Tavastians (yem) and Finns proper (sum) are mentioned on an expedition with Swedes (svei) in 1256. However, very little is known about the situation in Finland in the following decades. That is partly because Western Finland was now ruled from Turku and so most of the documents remained there. As the Novgorod forces burned the city in 1318 during the Swedish-Novgorodian Wars, very few of the documents about what had happened in the previous century remained. The last Swedish Crusade to Finland took place in 1293 against Karelians.

Eric's Chronicle: "Crusade against Tavastians"

See also
 Early Finnish wars
 First Swedish Crusade
 Third Swedish Crusade
 Northern Crusades
 Battle of Lihula
 Battle of the Neva

References

Sources

13th-century crusades
13th century in Finland
13th century in Sweden
Conflicts in 1249
Wars involving Sweden
Wars involving Finland
Northern Crusades